Strategic Air Command equipment includes weapon systems and ordnance (e.g., strategic weapons such as ICBMs), ground radars and computers (e.g., at SSN 1979-82), and other Cold War devices of the USAF major command.

Special Weapons Emergency Separation System
This system (SWESS), also known informally as the dead man's switch, was a nuclear bomb release system that the United States Air Force Strategic Air Command built into bombers such as the B-52 Stratofortress.  The system's purpose was to ensure that an aircraft's payload of nuclear weapons would detonate in the event of the crew becoming debilitated by enemy defences such as missiles.  Once armed, the system would ensure that the onboard nuclear weapons detonated if the aircraft dropped below a predetermined altitude.

SAC Equipment

See also
Permissive Action Link
Fail-deadly

References

Cold War military equipment of the United States Air Force
Equipment